Chigirinka is an agricultural settlement in Kirawsk District, Belarus. The settlement falls under the administrative division of Mogilev Region.

History 
The village was burned to the ground in 1943 by the Estonian collaborationist 658th Eastern Battalion under Major Alfons Rebane.

It was liberated in 1944 by the Soviet troops of the 1st Belorussian Front.

See also
 Occupation of Belarus by Nazi Germany

References

Populated places in Mogilev Region
Kirawsk District
Villages in Belarus
Bykhovsky Uyezd